Kripp Johnson (born Corinthian Johnson; May 16, 1933 in Cambridge, Maryland – June 22, 1990) was an American singer for The Del-Vikings from 1956 to the 1980s. Johnson sang lead vocal on their hit "Whispering Bells", among other songs. He died of cancer in 1990 at age 57.

References

1933 births
1990 deaths
20th-century American singers
People from Cambridge, Maryland